Kirmen Uribe (pronounced ; born October 5, 1970) is a Basque language writer.  He won the National Prize for Literature in Spain in 2009 for his first novel Bilbao-New York-Bilbao, which has been translated into over 15 languages. His poetry collection Meanwhile Take My Hand (Graywolf, 2007), translated into English by Elizabeth Macklin, was a finalist for the 2008 PEN Award for Poetry in Translation. His works have been published in The New Yorker, Open City and Little Star.

Early life
Kirmen Uribe was born in Ondarroa, a fishing town about one hour from Bilbao. Uribe's father (who died in 1999) was a trawlerman and his mother was a homemaker. He studied Basque Philology at the University of the Basque Country–Gasteiz, and did his graduate studies in Comparative Literature in Trento, Italy. He won his first literary prize in 1995 while he was in jail for being a conscientious objector and refusing to go to compulsory military service.

Career

Bilbao-New York-Bilbao
In 2008 Uribe published his first novel, Bilbao–New York–Bilbao (Elkar). The book sparked great curiosity. It received the Critics' Prize and the Spanish Literature Prize for Narrative. In early 2010 it was brought out simultaneously in Spanish (Seix-Barral), Galician (Xerais) and Catalan (Edicions 62). The novel Bilbao–New York–Bilbao is set on a hypothetical flight that its narrator, one Kirmen Uribe, takes from Bilbao's Loiu Airport to New York's J.F.K. On the flight, the writer contemplates his supposed novel-in-progress, which is about three generations of a family, his own, whose life is bound up with the sea. Bilbao–New York–Bilbao is a novel with no conventional plot to speak of. Its structure is that of a net, and the knots of the net are the stories of the three generations as they intersect with crosswise stories and reflections on the twentieth century as it was experienced in the Basque Country. Ollie Brock wrote about the novel in The Times Literary Supplement in August 2011: "Uribe has succeeded in realizing what is surely an ambition for many writers: a book that combines family, romances and literature, anchored deeply in a spoken culture but also in bookishness —and all without a single note of self-congratulation".

Mussche
His second novel, Mussche (Susa, 2013), translated into Spanish as Lo que mueve el mundo (Seix Barral) is a docu-fictional novel that tells the story of one of the thousands of Basque children who left the port of Bilbao way to exile in May 1937, during the Spanish Civil War, after the bombing of Guernica. Carmen, a girl of eight years, was hosted in the home of a poet and translator (Robert Mussche) in Ghent, Belgium. The writer's life changes with the arrival of the child and, gradually, the events lead to an unexpected ending. “A thrilling novel from the first line to the last. The vicissitudes of the young Belgian writer related to Basque war children is a narrative tense, exemplary in its structure and that oozes authenticity” reviewed César Coca (El Correo).  The novel shows the cruelty and absurdity of war to some extent, and it is recognized as a great work on the subject of anti-war. The Japanese translation, by Kaneko Nami, was awarded as the best translation of 2015 in Japan.

The Hour of Waking Together
His last novel, Elkarrekin esnatzeko ordua (Susa, 2016), continues in the recovery of forgotten lives to make fiction. Tells the life of Karmele Urresti, a Basque nurse who exiles to Paris in 1937, where she becomes involved with the Basque Cultural Embassy. It is there she meets her future husband, the musician Txomin Letamendi. Together they travel Europe, but when they know that Paris has fallen to the Germans, they flee to Venezuela. In Venezuela History gets again in their lives. Txomin decides to join the Basque secret services (under the command of the American intelligence, the OSS and FBI) and so the family goes back to Europe, just in the middle of World War II. He spies on the Nazis until he gets arrested in Barcelona, under a dictatorship he won't survive. Karmele will have to risk everything and part, again and alone, to Venezuela.
JA Masoliver Ródenas wrote in La Vanguardia about the novel: «The direct and precise prose of Kirmen Uribe doesn’t have to fool us: it’s the fruit of accuracy, not simplicity. His background is that of a cosmopolitan and sophisticated writer. (…) A writer of great and real talent.» The novel was simultaneously published in Basque (Susa), Spanish (Seix Barral) and Catalan (Edicions 62) and won the 2016 Spanish Critic's Award (Narrative in Basque) and 2016 Basque Readers Academy Award (Best Book of 2016).

On the international scene
He has participated in a number of international literary festivals including New York's PEN World Voices Festival, the Berlin International Poetry Festival, Tai Pei International Poetry Festival and Medellin International Poetry Festival. He has given lectures and led seminars at Stanford, Brown, New York University, University of Chicago, Ohio State, California Institute of the Arts, University of California-San Diego and the University of Foreign Studies of Tokyo, among others.

His poems have appeared in renowned periodicals and international anthologies. In May 2003 The New Yorker magazine published his poem "May." Since then his work has appeared in other U.S. journals as well. In 2006, the Berlin online magazine Lyrikline published a selection of 10 of his poems in German translation; it was the first time that journal of international poetry had ever published work by a Basque writer. In 2008, the American literary critics Kevin Prufer and Wayne Millar included three of Uribe's poems in their New European Poets anthology.

In 2017 he was selected for the International Writers Program (IWP) in Iowa City.

Works

Poetry
Bitartean heldu eskutik (2001), Meanwhile Take My Hand (English edition, 2007).
Zaharregia, txikiegia agian (Too old, Too Small Maybe, collaboration; 2003)
Bar Puerto (multimedia project; 2010)
17 segundo (2019)

Novels
Bilbao-New York-Bilbao (2008)
Mussche (2012)
Elkarrekin esnatzeko ordua (2016)
Izurdeen aurreko bizitza (2021)

Children's books
Garmendia eta zaldun beltza. 2003, Elkar.
Ekidazu, lehoiek ez dakite biolina jotzen. 2003, Elkar.
Ez naiz ilehoria, eta zer?. Elkar.
Garmendia errege. Elkar.
Garmendia eta Fannyren sekretua. Elkar.

Essays
Lizardi eta erotismoa. 1996, Alberdania.

Anthologies/compilations
Portukoplak (2006, Elkar)
Contributor to Ghost Fishing: An Eco-Justice Poetry Anthology (2018, University of Georgia Press)

Prizes

Spanish Critics Award (Poetry in Basque) 2002 for Meanwhile take my hand.
Spanish National Book Award (Narrative) 2009 for his novel Bilbao-New York-Bilbao.
Spanish Critics Award (Narrative in Basque) 2009 for his novel Bilbao-New York-Bilbao.
"El Correo-Vocento" 2010 Journalism Award for the best article in the Spanish Press.
Spanish Critics Award (Narrative in Basque) 2017 for his novel Elkarrekin esnatzeko ordua (La hora de despertarnos juntos).

Notes

Literatur
  María José Olaziregi Alustiza/Amaia Elizalde Estenaga (eds.): Kirmen Uribe: escritura y vida, Berlin ; Bern ; Wien : Peter Lang, [2021], ISBN 978-3-631-84503-5

External links

Kirmen Uribe's website
Graywolf Press
Brooklyn Rail

People from Ondarroa
Spanish male writers
1970 births
Living people
Basque-language writers
University of the Basque Country alumni
University of Trento alumni
Spanish expatriates in Italy
Conscientious objectors
21st-century Spanish novelists